Carmen Small (born April 22, 1980) is an American former racing cyclist, who currently works as a directeur sportif for UCI Women's WorldTeam .

Outside of cycling, Small was a founding member of The Cyclists' Alliance and vice director for 2018–2019.

Major results

Source:

2008
 8th Grand Prix Elsy Jacobs
2010
 3rd Road race, National Road Championships
 10th Overall Redlands Bicycle Classic
2011
 6th Time trial, National Road Championships
2012
 1st Classica Citta di Padova
 2nd Chrono Champenois
 National Road Championships
3rd Road race
4th Time trial
 5th Grand Prix Cycliste de Gatineau
 7th Grand Prix de Dottignies
 7th Chrono Gatineau
 9th Overall The Exergy Tour
2013
 UCI Road World Championships
1st  Team time trial (with Ellen van Dijk, Evelyn Stevens, Lisa Brennauer and Trixi Worrack)
3rd  Time trial
 1st  Time trial, National Road Championships
 1st Chrono Gatineau
 1st Stage 1 (TTT) Belgium Tour
 1st Stage 2 (TTT) Holland Ladies Tour
 1st Stage 2 Thüringen Rundfahrt der Frauen
 2nd  Time trial, Pan American Road Championships
 2nd Chrono Champenois – Trophée Européen
 4th Ronde van Gelderland
 10th Ronde van Drenthe World Cup
 10th Trofeo Alfredo Binda-Comune di Cittiglio
2014
 1st  Team time trial, UCI Road World Championships
 1st Open de Suède Vårgårda TTT
 2nd Time trial, National Road Championships
 9th GP Comune di Cornaredo
2015
 1st  Time trial, Pan American Road Championships
 1st Chrono Gatineau
 2nd Time trial, National Road Championships
 6th Winston-Salem Cycling Classic
2016
 1st  Time trial, National Road Championships
 1st  Mountains classification Grand Prix Elsy Jacobs
 3rd Overall Cascade Cycling Classic
1st Stage 1
 5th Overall Emakumeen Euskal Bira
 5th Gent–Wevelgem
 6th Overall Ladies Tour of Norway
 6th Madrid Challenge by La Vuelta
 7th GP de Plouay – Bretagne
 8th RideLondon Grand Prix
 10th Omloop Het Nieuwsblad

References

External links

1980 births
Living people
American female cyclists
People from Durango, Colorado
UCI Road World Champions (women)
21st-century American women
Cyclists from Colorado